Sébastien Jouve (born 8 December 1982 in Mont-Saint-Aignan) is a French sprint canoeist who has competed since the late 2000s. He won eight medals at the ICF Canoe Sprint World Championships with three golds (K-2 200 m, K-4 1000 m: both 2010, K-2 200m: 2011), two silvers (K-4 1000 m: 2009, K-1 4 x 200m: 2014), and three bronzes (K-1 4 x 200 m: 2009, K-2 500 m: 2013, K-2 200m: 2014).

Jouve also finished seventh in the K-2 500 m event at the 2008 Summer Olympics in Beijing and also competed at the 2012 Summer Olympics where he came fourth in the .K-2 200 m with Arnaud Hybois.

External links
 
 
 
 Canoe09.ca profile

1982 births
Canoeists at the 2008 Summer Olympics
Canoeists at the 2012 Summer Olympics
Canoeists at the 2016 Summer Olympics
French male canoeists
Living people
Olympic canoeists of France
People from Mont-Saint-Aignan
ICF Canoe Sprint World Championships medalists in kayak
European Games competitors for France
Canoeists at the 2015 European Games
Sportspeople from Seine-Maritime
Mediterranean Games gold medalists for France
Mediterranean Games medalists in canoeing
Competitors at the 2005 Mediterranean Games